Associazione Sportiva Dilettantistica Sarone, simply known as Sarone, was an Italian association football club located in Sarone, a village in the municipality of Caneva, Friuli-Venezia Giulia. It was dissolved in 2010 after a merger with ASD Pro Aviano to form ASD Pro Aviano S.E., a club based in Aviano, thus decreeing the end of ASD Sarone.

The club was re-founded in 2017 as ASD Sarone 1975-2017.

History
The club was founded in 1975, and until the mid 90's it always played in the minor leagues. A series of excellent season played led the club to reach Serie D in 2007. Then began the descent that led Sarone in 2010 to merge with ASD Pro Aviano (Prima Categoria club) to form ASD Pro Aviano SE, club based in Aviano and placed in Promozione, thus decreeing the end of ASD Sarone.

On June 28, 2010, ASD Sporting Sarone was born, which represented the town without being a direct descendant of ASD Sarone. Sporting in 2012 enrolled in the Terza Categoria. In the summer of 2015 Sporting merged with ASD Caneva (Seconda Categoria team) to form ASD SaroneCaneva, a club based in Caneva.

In Sarone it was hard to bear to be left without a team, so in summer 2017 ASD Sarone 1975-2017 was founded. It was composed by the Saronese players of ASD SaroneCaneva and ASD Pro Aviano S.E. and registered in Terza Categoria.

Recent seasons

Key

Honours
Eccellenza Friuli-Venezia Giulia (1st regional level)
Winners: 2006–07

Promozione Friuli-Venezia Giulia (2nd regional level)
Runners-up: 2001–02

Prima Categoria Friuli-Venezia Giulia (3rd regional level)
Winners: 1996–97

Seconda Categoria Friuli-Venezia Giulia (4th regional level)
Winners: 1994–95

Colors and badge 
The team's colors are white and red.

References

External links
 Sarone page @ Serie-D.com
Sarone page @ friuligol.it
Sarone page @ tuttocampo.it
Sarone page @ facebook.com

Football clubs in Italy
Football clubs in Friuli-Venezia Giulia
1975 establishments in Italy